Grue, used as a surname, may refer to: 
 
 Francesco Grue (1618–1673), Italian potter and painter 
 Francesco Antonio Xaverio Grue (1686–1746), Italian potter and painter; son of Francesco 
 Joe Grue (born ?), American bridge player
 John Grue (born 1957), Norwegian mathematician 
 David Grue (born March 11, 1986), American mathematics teacher